The 1961–62 Intertoto Cup was the first Intertoto Cup, a football tournament for European clubs that would otherwise not have a European competition to compete in. The inaugural tournament was won by Ajax, who defeated Feyenoord in the final. The competition was contested by 32 clubs, almost exclusively from central Europe – Austria, Czechoslovakia, East Germany, the Netherlands, Switzerland and Sweden entered four clubs each; Poland entered two; and West Germany entered six clubs. Eventually the final became a clash between Dutch rivals Ajax and Feyenoord.

Teams location

Group stage
The teams were divided into eight groups of four clubs each. The groups were themselves divided geographically as 'A' for eastern countries (Austria, Czechoslovakia, East Germany, and Poland) and 'B' for western countries (the Netherlands, Sweden and Switzerland). Teams from West Germany were placed in both sections. The eight group winners (in bold in the tables below) advanced to the knock-out rounds, with the four 'A' winners being drawn against the four 'B' winners.

Group A1

Group A2

Group A3

Group A4

Group B1

Group B2

Group B3

Group B4

Quarter-finals

Semi-finals

Final
Played over one leg, in Amsterdam.

See also
 1961–62 European Cup
 1961–62 UEFA Cup Winners' Cup
 1961–62 Inter-Cities Fairs Cup

External links
 Intertoto Cup 1961/62 by Karel Stokkermans at RSSSF
  by Pawel Mogielnicki

UEFA Intertoto Cup
4